Rule egoism is the doctrine under which an individual evaluates the optimal set of rules according to whether conformity to those rules bring the most benefit to himself. An action, therefore, is right if it promotes his welfare at least as well as any alternative rule available to him. It is associated with foundational egoism, which maintains that normative factors must be grounded in consideration of the agent's well-being - something that rule egoism does but in a way that avoids factoral egoism.

Development 
Although it is claimed that Thomas Hobbes is a rule-egoist, the term "rule egoism" was first coined by Richard Brandt in his work "Rationality, Egoism, and Morality, where it was briefly mentioned.

See also
 Enlightened self-interest
 Ethical egoism
 Psychological egoism
 Rational egoism
 Rule utilitarianism
 Virtue ethics

References

Egoism